The 1870 East Devon by-election was fought on 9 April 1870.  The by-election was fought due to the resignation of the incumbent Conservative MP Lord Courtenay.  It was won unopposed by the Conservative candidate John Henry Kennaway.

References

1870 in England
1870 elections in the United Kingdom
By-elections to the Parliament of the United Kingdom in Devon constituencies
19th century in Devon
Unopposed by-elections to the Parliament of the United Kingdom in English constituencies